Deane may refer to:

Places 
 Deane, Greater Manchester, an area of Bolton and a former historic parish
 Deane, Hampshire, a village
 Deane, Kentucky

Ships
 USS Deane (1778), US Navy frigate named after Silas Deane
 HMS Deane (K551), a 1943 British Royal Navy frigate which served in the Second World War

See also
 Deane (name), for people with the name Deane
 Dean (surname)
 Dean (disambiguation)
Tribes of Galway, which includes Deane as one of the Tribes